Eucalanus bungii is a copepod found in the north Pacific and surrounding waters.

Description
Separation of males from females is possible in stage IV copepodites and older individuals.

Distribution
E. bungii is found in the north Pacific, and is considered to be an expatriate to Arctic waters.

Ecology

Life cycle and reproduction
There are two peaks of reproduction in E. bungii. At Station P, these peaks were observed to occur in early May and early June. At Site H, off of the east coast of Hokkaido, on the other hand, reproduction occurred from April to June or July, and in August. Spawning occurs at night, when the females migrate to the mixed layer. Nauplii through stage II copepodites are found almost exclusively in the top  of depth, and they are particularly abundant above the thermocline. During the peak of their abundance, stage III through V copepodites and stage VI female copepodites are found above the thermocline. Stage VI male copepodites, on the other hand, are primarily found between  when they peak in abundance.

It has been proposed that at Site H, the young spawned earlier in the year enter diapause as stage IV copepodites, and thus have an annual lifecycle, and those spawned later enter diapause as stage III copepodites, and then enter diapause again as stage V copepodites, rendering their life cycle biennial. At Station P, the life cycle of E. bungii seems to be biennial, with stage III or IV copepodites entering diapause in their first summer, and then entering diapause again, usually as stage V copepodites, their second summer. At Site H, diapause occurs from August to March.

References

Calanoida